Edward Brooke-Hitching is an English author, and a writer and researcher for the BBC panel show QI, as a member of the team known as the "QI Elves". He is the son of the rare book dealer Franklin Brooke-Hitching and a descendant of the printer and bibliographer William Blades, who wrote the history of book preservation The Enemies of Books.

His Fox Tossing, Octopus Wrestling and Other Forgotten Sports described 90 obsolete pastimes and  The Spectator'''s reviewer said "A book like this, the result of enormously diligent library ferreting, doesn't have any pressing reason to exist, but I am glad it does. Its pointlessness is its pleasure." It described sports including fox tossing, octopus wrestling and ski ballet. His The Phantom Atlas describes places which appear on maps but do not exist: the Times reviewer says that it "shows how places that aren’t there can endure, sometimes for centuries, once a map-maker has inked them in".  The Sky Atlas was shortlisted for the 2019 Edward Stanford Travel Writing Awards in the "Illustrated travel book" category and picked as one of the 50 Christmas books of the year by The Herald.

In 2007 he directed a short documentary about the Edinburgh-based Really Terrible Orchestra.

He appeared on BBC Radio 4's The Museum of Curiosity'' in October 2019. His hypothetical donation to this imaginary museum was "A land grant for 60 acres of land in Poyais", being a document produced by 1820s fraudster Gregor MacGregor.

Selected publications

References

External links

English book and manuscript collectors
Year of birth missing (living people)
English non-fiction writers
Living people